The Massachusetts Naval Militia (at first called the Massachusetts Colonial Navy and later the Massachusetts State Navy), was a  naval militia active during the American Revolutionary War. It was founded December 29, 1775, to defend the interests of Massachusetts during the war.

The flotilla utilized 25 vessels over the course of the war, acting in various roles such as prison ships, dispatch vessels, and combat cruisers.  Its most infamous engagement was the 1779 Penobscot Expedition, in which not only all of its vessels were destroyed, but also those of privateers hired to assist in the expedition.

It was later activated for the War of 1812 and the Spanish–American War.

As under 10 U.S. Code §7851 naval militias form part of the United States organized militia and therefore are considered as such, any action to reactivate one of the nation's historic naval militia forces falls either on the Governor of Massachusetts or by legislative action of the chambers of the Massachusetts General Court.

Authorization

Following the outbreak of the American Revolutionary War with the Battles of Lexington and Concord in April 1775, the Massachusetts Provincial Congress, which effectively controlled the Province of Massachusetts Bay, began discussing the need for naval defenses against raids and punitive actions by the British Royal Navy against coastal communities in the province. A committee set up for the purpose on June 7 submitted a report on June 12 recommending the outfitting of at least six vessels, mounting up to fourteen guns, that would be managed by the province's Committee of Safety. Further discussion was apparently delayed by the Battle of Bunker Hill on June 17, and was not taken up again until August. In the interim, the Provincial Congress was replaced by the Massachusetts Great and General Court as the province's legislative body, with a council acting as the executive. It received a petition in August from the town of Machias in the District of Maine (now the state of Maine) for protection and relief following the June Battle of Machias, in which a British sloop-of-war was seized, and the capture in July of two more British ships.  The legislature responded by officially adopting Machias Liberty and Diligence, appointing Jeremiah O'Brien their commander, with authorization to hire up to thirty seamen.  These two ships served the state until October 1776.

On November 1, the Massachusetts legislature enacted a law authorizing the issuance of letters of marque, as well as the creation of admiralty courts for judging naval disputes and the disposition of captured prize ships and cargo. On February 7, 1776, it enacted a law authorizing the construction of ten sloops, to carry fourteen to sixteen guns each, and approved £10,000 for their construction.

Ships, 1776 to 1779

The first ships constructed were the sloop Tyrannicide and the brigantines Rising Empire and Independence, which were ready to sail in June 1776. These were followed by the sloops Republic, Freedom, and Massachusetts in September. While they were being built, additional legislation was enacted, establishing pay scales and rules for prize distribution, and in October a Board of War was created to oversee naval activities (military as well as economic) of the state.

Over the course of the war, several additional ships were either purchased or constructed by the state. In 1777, the brigantine Hazard was built, and in 1778 a plan to construct two larger ships was entertained and eventually abandoned due to the cost. The brigantine Active, a prize taken by Hazard, was purchased in 1779. In April 1778, construction was authorized on the largest ship in the state navy. Protector, a 28-gun frigate and a crew complement of 200, was launched in the fall of 1779. Unfortunately, due to the disaster of the Penobscot Expedition, it was then the only ship in the state navy.

New Constitution
Administration of the navy was changed with the adoption in 1780 of a new state constitution. The governor was responsible for issuing commissions and orders, and the Agent of the Commonwealth was responsible for outfitting the state's ships, and the Board of War ceased to exist.

Ships, 1780 to 1783
The state continued to authorize new ships for the navy. In the spring of 1780 the Mars was purchased, and the Defence was purchased in 1781.  During the following winter and spring, Tartar and Winthrop, the last ship commissioned into the navy, were constructed for the state.

Privateering and prizes
The state issued nearly 1,000 letters of marque authorizing privateering activities. The Massachusetts prize courts were busiest in 1779, when more than 180 prizes were adjudicated.  This activity resulted in a demand for prison capacity for the captured crews, and the competition between the state navy and the privateers resulted in increased costs to the state to man its ships.

Naval activities

While the state's ships were most often patrolling in nearby waters, they ranged as far as the European coast, where prizes were sometimes taken (although those were also often recovered by the British). Its ships sometimes worked in concert with privateers, Continental Navy vessels, and French vessels.

On 25 November 1776, a 14-gun brig with a crew of 70 men under the command of Lieutenant George (or James) Dawson, captured Independence, Captain Simeon Sampson, after a hard fight during which Dawson out sailed Sampson. As Independence had a larger crew and outgunned Hope she should have prevailed, but superior sailing, tactics, and a better crew delivered the victory to Hope. Hope escorted Independence to Fort Cumberland, where 14 of her guns were transferred to the fort's defenses.

On 5 May 1781  and  captured Protector. The British Royal Navy took her into service as HMS Hussar, and then sold her in 1783. The Danish East India Company purchased her and she continued to sail at least through 1785 as Hussar.

Still, most of the Massachusetts navy's engagements were minor, involving only a small number of ships, and little or no combat. The most notable exception was the Penobscot Expedition, organized by the state in response to a British expedition that established a fortified base on the eastern shore of Penobscot Bay.  The naval component of the state's response included three ships of the state navy, one from the New Hampshire State Navy, three Continental Navy vessels, and numerous private vessels, including transports for the 1,000 militia that were sent to dislodge the British.  The operation was a fiasco. The Continental Navy's Commodore Dudley Saltonstall, who commanded the fleet, disagreed with Solomon Lovell, the militia commander, over the overall command of the expedition. When a British fleet arrived, Saltonstall's fleet disintegrated. Ships surrendered, grounded and burned, or were abandoned after fleeing up the Penobscot River.  The expedition has been called the worst United States naval defeat prior to the Japanese attack on Pearl Harbor in World War II.  Inquiries into the matter faulted Saltonstall for his actions; he was dismissed from the navy.

The navy continued in operations until June 4, 1783, when the Winthrop, the last ship owned by the state, was sold.

Captains
The list of names is from Paullin unless otherwise cited; other fields are from other sources.

Ships
The list of names, ship type, and years of service are from Paullin unless otherwise cited; other fields are from other sources.

Notes

References

 Allen, Gardner Weld  (1913) A naval history of the American Revolution. Vol. 1. (Houghton Mifflin Company).
 
 Clarke, Ernest (1999) The Siege of Fort Cumberland, 1776: An Episode in the American Revolution. (McGill-Queen's Press). 
   This work contains summary information on each of the various state navies.
  This work contains a summary of the Republic history, and its captains.

External links

 The Colonial Navy of Massachusetts

History of the United States Navy
Massachusetts in the American Revolution
Military in Massachusetts
State defense forces of the United States
1775 establishments in Massachusetts
1783 disestablishments in Massachusetts